The Professor of Law at Gresham College, London, gives free educational lectures to the general public to bring the 'new learning' to Londoners, in English rather than Latin (the language of universities for most of Europe at that time). The college was founded by Sir Thomas Gresham for this purpose in 1597. It was the first Institute of Higher Education in London, when it appointed seven professors. This has since increased to ten and in addition the college now has visiting professors. The Professor of Law is always appointed by the Mercers' Side of the Joint Grand Gresham Committee, a body administered jointly by the Worshipful Company of Mercers and the City of London Corporation.

List of Gresham Professors of Law
Note, years given as, say, 1596/7 refer to Old Style and New Style dates.

References
Gresham College old website, Internet Archive List of professors

Notes

Further reading

Law
1596 establishments in England